Hardeep Grewal  is a Canadian politician who was elected to the Legislative Assembly of Ontario in the 2022 provincial election. He represents the riding of Brampton East as a member of the Progressive Conservative Party of Ontario.

References 

Living people
Canadian politicians of Indian descent
Progressive Conservative Party of Ontario MPPs
Politicians from Brampton
21st-century Canadian politicians
Year of birth missing (living people)
Canadian Sikhs